SRY-box 7 is a protein that in humans is encoded by the SOX7 gene.

Function

This gene encodes a member of the SOX (SRY-related HMG-box) family of transcription factors involved in the regulation of embryonic development and in the determination of the cell fate. The encoded protein may act as a transcriptional regulator after forming a protein complex with other proteins. The protein may play a role in tumorigenesis. A similar protein in mice is involved in the regulation of the wingless-type MMTV integration site family (Wnt) pathway. [provided by RefSeq, Jul 2008].

SOX7 is a transcription factor that comes from the SRY-related HMG-Box family of transcription factors. These factors play a significant developmental role in regulating processes such as hematopoiesis, vasculogenesis, and cardiogenesis during the development of the embryo. Additionally, SOX7 is unique as it has been shown to also have tumor-suppressive effects, and downregulation of this gene has been seen in many forms of cancer. SOX7 as well as SOX17 and SOX18 have been known to work together to play a significant role in cardiovascular development, but continued research continues to identify SOX7 as playing a significant role in cancerous tumor suppression. Scientists discovered that the homozygous deletion of the second exon in SOX7 was embryonically lethal, and a heterozygous deletion resulted in a congenital diaphragmatic hernia forming. Continued research needs to be done to fully understand the mechanism behind SOX7’s tumor-suppressing characteristics, and hopefully, utilize that to find new and improved cancer treatments for the future. Overall SOX7 is a very interesting gene that plays a significant role in a variety of vital processes embryonically and postnatally and understanding the mechanisms for how this SRY family gene interacts with its surrounding tissues and cells can lead to better treatments for defects within SOX7 in the future.

References 

Stovall, Daniel B et al. “SOX7: from a developmental regulator to an emerging tumor suppressor.” Histology and histopathology vol. 29,4 (2014): 439-45. doi:10.14670/HH-29.10.439

Further reading